Charles Whitfield may refer to:
 Charles L. Whitfield, American physician and author on childhood trauma
 Charles Malik Whitfield (born 1971), American actor
 Charles Richard Whitfield (1927–2018), Northern Irish obstetrician and gynaecologist
 Charles Whitfield, American music producer at Hidden Beach Recordings